The tenth edition of the World Cup tournament took place in Izmir, Turkey from August 11 to 13, 2011. The World Cup 9th edition was held in İzmir in 2011.

Participating teams

Round-robin

All time UTC+2.

Final standings

External links
Official website

Basketball World Cup (Turkey)
Sports competitions in Izmir
2011–12 in Turkish basketball
2011–12 in Serbian basketball
2011–12 in Ukrainian basketball
2011–12 in German basketball